Eagle's Nest Arena is an indoor arena located on the California State University, Los Angeles campus.

Seating 3,200 at full capacity, it hosted the judo competitions for the 1984 Summer Olympics. It also hosted the inaugural JBA playoffs for the rounds up to the championship in 2018.

References
1984 Summer Olympics official report. Volume 1. Part 1. pp. 137–9.
California State University, Los Angeles athletic facility profiles. - accessed 5 September 2010.

College basketball venues in the United States
College volleyball venues in the United States
Cal State Los Angeles Golden Eagles men's basketball
Venues of the 1984 Summer Olympics
Olympic judo venues
Basketball venues in Los Angeles
Volleyball venues in Los Angeles
Northeast Los Angeles